The 2019 Giro dell'Emilia was the 102nd edition of the Giro dell'Emilia road cycling one day race. It was held on 5 October 2019 as part of the 2019 UCI Europe Tour as a 1.HC-ranked event.

Teams
Twenty-five teams were invited in the race, of which eleven are UCI WorldTour teams, eight are UCI Professional Continental teams, and six are UCI Continental teams. Each team entered seven riders, though eight teams (Sangemini–MG.K Vis, and ) only entered six riders, and  only entered five.

UCI WorldTeams

 
 
 
 
 
 
 
 
 
 
 

UCI Professional Continental Teams

 
 
 
 
 
 
 
 

UCI Continental Teams

 
 
 
 Sangemini–MG.K Vis

Results

References

Sources

External links

Giro dell'Emilia
Giro dell'Emilia
Giro dell'Emilia